Rocca dei Tre Vescovi (French: Rocher des Trois Évêques) is a mountain in the Maritime Alps, on the boundary between the province of Cuneo (Piedmont, northern Italy) and the French region of Provence-Alpes-Côte-d'Azur.

Geography 
Located near the Maddalena Pass, it is joined to the nearby Enciastraia peak by a ridge. The name, meaning "Rock of the Three Bishops", derives from the fact that the mount is on the intersection point of three Catholic dioceses, those of Cuneo, Nice and Digne.

SOIUSA classification 
According to the SOIUSA (International Standardized Mountain Subdivision of the Alps) the mountain can be classified in the following way:
 main part = Western Alps
 major sector = South Western Alps
 section = Maritime Alps
 subsection = (Fr:Alpes Maritimes d.l.s.l./It:Alpi Marittime)
 supergroup = (Fr:Chaîne Corborant-Ténibre-Enchastraye/It:Catena Corborant-Tenibres-Enciastraia)
 group = (Fr:Massif Enchastraye-Siguret/It:Gruppo Enciastraia-Siguret) 
 subgroup = (Fr:Groupe de l'Enchastraye/It:Gruppo dell'Enciastraia)
 code = I/A-2.1-C.12.a

References

Sources

Mountains of Piedmont
Mountains of the Alps
Mountains of Alpes-Maritimes
Two-thousanders of France
France–Italy border
International mountains of Europe
Two-thousanders of Italy
Mountains partially in France